The  are a fictional alien organism and antagonists in the Metroid video game series. Within the lore of the series, their life cycle involves several distinct metamorphoses, but they are most commonly encountered in (and among players, most frequently recognized by) their larval form, in which they resemble a floating, jellyfish-like organism with tripartite or quadripartite nuclei.  Metroids are capable of siphoning an undetectable life energy from any life form, generally causing the death of the victim in the process. This energy can also be extracted from the Metroid in turn, allowing it to be used as a living power source.

Though Metroids are often described as parasites, their nature of aggressively devouring all lifeforms more closely resembles that of a predator.

Characteristics
Metroids are throughout the series shown to be highly adaptive to outside stimuli. The original Metroid established that exposure to beta rays would cause Metroids to multiply very quickly. 

Metroid II: Return of Samus and the remake Metroid: Samus Returns established a five-stage life cycle in which those Metroids native to their home planet SR388 go through two stages of ecdysis followed by two stages of mutation, thus maturing through five previously unknown forms: Alpha Metroid, Gamma Metroid, Zeta Metroid, Omega Metroid, and the uncommon Queen Metroid (the latter as the primary antagonist of the game). They are frequently shown to be vulnerable to ice-based weaponry such as the Ice Beam and freeze guns. These weapons can freeze most Metroids instantly, and often all it takes to finish them off after this is a strong impact such as one from a missile.

The Metroids were originally bio-engineered by a faction of the ancient Chozo race in order to combat the X Parasites on SR388, but they turned against their masters, forcing the latter to leave the planet.

Appearances
Metroids appear in almost all games in the Metroid series. One particular Metroid, the Baby Metroid that imprints on Samus Aran after she destroys the Metroid Queen in Metroid II: Return of Samus, becomes an important character in later games. They also made an appearance in Kirby's Dream Land 3, and the Kid Icarus series (under the name "Komayto"). A Metroid appears as an Assist Trophy in Super Smash Bros. Brawl, Super Smash Bros. for Nintendo 3DS and Wii U, and Super Smash Bros. Ultimate.

Reception
Game Informer called the Metroid their favorite alien race in video gaming, praising how their appearance is "truly alien" and that they "pose an immediate and real danger" when they appear. Hardcore Gaming 101 called their design "iconic", and praised their first appearance in the original Metroid, saying that it was "a moment of shock and terror almost unlike anything in any other NES game", especially if the player did not know how to beat them.

References

Fictional extraterrestrial life forms
Metroid characters
Fictional monsters
Nintendo antagonists
Fictional parasites and parasitoids
Video game species and races
Video game characters introduced in 1986